= Kati Abu ol Hasan Kola Castle =

Castle in Mazandaran Province, Iran

Kati Abu ol Hasan Kola castle
- قلعه کتی ابوالحسن‌کلا

General information
- Type: Castle
- Location: Babol County, Iran

Kati Abu ol Hasan Kola castle (Persian: قلعه کتی ابوالحسن‌کلا) is a historical castle located in Babol County in Mazandaran Province, The longevity of this fortress dates back to the Historical periods after Islam.
